The University of Mississippi School of Engineering was officially established in 1900 as part of the University of Mississippi in the U.S. state of Mississippi.   In 1854 the Board of Trustees established a department of engineering at the University of Mississippi to complement a strong program in the natural sciences.  It is considered the oldest school of engineering in the state of Mississippi.

Research centers
Center for Advanced Infrastructure Technology (CAIT)
Composite Materials Research Group (CMRG)
Center for Community Earthquake Preparedness (CCEP)
Geoinformatics Center
Institute for Advanced Education in GeoSpatial Sciences
Mississippi Mineral Resources Institute and Center for Marine Resources and Environmental Technology (MMRI-CMRET)
National Center for Computational Hydroscience and Engineering (NCCHE)

Facilities
The first four facilities are located on the "Circle" adjacent to the Lyceum.  Weir Hall is located next to the J. D. Williams Library.  The four primary engineering buildings are planned for an extensive renovation as part of the "Campaign for Engineering" being conducted.

Anderson Hall
Carrier Hall
Old Chemistry
Dr. Charles E. Smith Engineering Sciences Building
Weir Hall (Computer Science)

Deans of School of Engineering
Alfred Hume 1900–1908
Walter Hugh Drane 1908–1911
John Hazard Dorrah 1911–1931
Alfred Hume 1931–1933 (Acting)
Andrew Broadus Hargis 1933–1937
Lee H. Johnson 1937–1950
Frederick H. Kellogg 1950–1964
Karl Brenkert, Jr 1964–1979
Allie M. Smith 1979–2000
James G. Vaughan 2000-2000 (Acting)
Kai-Fong Lee 2001–2009
Alexander Cheng 2009–2018
David Puleo 2018-Present

Accreditation
Five programs in the School of Engineering at the University of Mississippi are accredited by the Engineering Accreditation Commission (EAC) Accreditation Board for Engineering and Technology (ABET).  These programs will be accredited through the next general review in the 2016-2017 academic year. 

Chemical Engineering (BSChE – 1954)
Civil Engineering (BSCE – 1949)
Electrical Engineering (BSEE – 1969)
Geological Engineering (BSGE – 1987)
Mechanical Engineering (BSME – 1959)
Biomedical Engineering (BSBME – 2017)

In addition, the School of Engineering also offers a B. S. degree in Computer Science (BSCS) that is accredited by the Computer Accreditation Commission (CAC) of ABET.  This program will be accredited through the next general review in the 2008–2009 academic year.

Notable professors and alumni
Dr. Charles E. Smith – Former Chair of Electrical Engineering
William W. Parsons – Director of NASA's Kennedy Space Center
Dr. William E. Genetti - Former Chair of Chemical Engineering who died in 1989 while serving as chair

External links

Engineering
Engineering schools and colleges in the United States
Engineering universities and colleges in Mississippi
Educational institutions established in 1900
1900 establishments in Mississippi